Antonín Kinský (born 31 May 1975) is a Czech former professional footballer who played as a goalkeeper. He played club football in the Czech Republic for nine seasons, winning the national league in 2002 with FC Slovan Liberec. He subsequently moved to Russia, where he played for Saturn Ramenskoye. During his seven years in Russia, he played 200 competitive games and was recognised as the Russian Premier League's best goalkeeper in the 2007 season.

Kinský played for his country on five occasions. He was part of the Czech Republic squad at UEFA Euro 2004 and the 2006 FIFA World Cup, although he played at neither tournament.

Club career

Early career
Kinský played for a number of clubs in his early career, including Dukla Prague, after which he moved to Bohemians 1905. He later spent time on loan at Motorlet Prague and EMĚ Mělník. Kinský won promotion with FC Dukla to the Gambrinus Liga, where he played for one season.

Liberec
Kinský joined FC Slovan Liberec in 1998, reaching the final of the 1998–99 Czech Cup in his first season. In the summer of 1999 Kinský broke his thumb, resultantly not playing for the autumn half of the 1999–2000 season and subsequently sharing goalkeeping duties with Zbyněk Hauzr in the spring. Liberec finished the season by winning the 1999–2000 Czech Cup.

In July 2000, Kinský was diagnosed with infectious mononucleosis, receiving treatment at the military hospital in Prague and resultantly being unable to play in the autumn part of the 2000–01 season. The following season, he recorded consecutive clean sheets at the beginning of the campaign. Liberec went on to reach the quarter finals of the 2001–02 UEFA Cup and won the 2001–02 Gambrinus liga.

During a UEFA Cup match in the Georgian capital of Tbilisi in October 2002, Kinský was targeted by bottles thrown onto the pitch from the crowd as the home team was defeated 1–0 in the match and 4–2 on aggregate. Three policemen were injured in the incident. He played in goal in a 4–0 league defeat against Viktoria Žižkov in October 2002, a game he described as "probably the worst match in my life." November 2002 was more successful for Kinský as he saved two penalties in a UEFA Cup penalty shootout, after the second round tie against Ipswich Town had ended level after extra time. Resultantly Liberec qualified for the third round of the competition, although Kinský missed both matches against Panathinaikos due to injury. Kinský's contract at Liberec was due to expire in the summer of 2004 and he failed to agree a contract extension with the club during the 2003–04 season. He left having made a total of 137 appearances in the top division of Czech football.

Russia
Kinský joined Russian side Saturn Ramenskoye in January 2004, initially signing a three-year contract. Kinský joined the team on 6 January in Turkey at their training camp ahead of the 2004 Russian Premier League. He started the first six matches of the 2004 season as a substitute, before becoming the club's first-choice goalkeeper. In 2005, he was vice captain for the team, captaining the side in the absence of captain Viktor Onopko.

Following the 2006 World Cup, Kinský signed a contract extension to stay at the club for another three years. He was named the best goalkeeper of the Russian Football Premier League in 2007. He kept his 100th top division clean sheet in a match against Tomsk in September 2008, becoming the 17th Czech goalkeeper to reach this figure. In October 2008, Kinský was offered the chance to move to Chelsea to be the backup goalkeeper for Petr Čech, an offer which he rejected. In November 2010 Kinský played his 200th competitive match for the club. Before the last game of the 2010 season, he was presented with a football shirt with the number 201 on it, intended to represent the number of games he had played for the club. However, due to injury Kinský was unable to take part in the match, so 200 was his actual number of competitive appearances. He left Saturn upon the expiry of his contract in December 2010.

International career
Kinský played for the under-17 team of Czechoslovakia in 1992, making two appearances. He went on to make three appearances for the Czech Republic national under-21 football team in 1997.

Kinský was called up to the Czech Republic national team by coach Karel Brückner before their participation in two friendly matches in Cyprus in February 2002. He was one of three uncapped goalkeepers named in the squad, the others being Petr Čech and Martin Vaniak. He made his debut in Cyprus on 13 February, playing the second half of the game against the host country in a 4–3 win.

Kinský was named in the Czech Republic squad for two major tournaments, UEFA Euro 2004 and the 2006 FIFA World Cup, but didn't play in either competition. He played in a total of five matches for his national team between 2002 and 2004. He also made one appearance for the "A2" team of his country in 2006, playing the second half of a match against Turkey B on 1 March.

Post-playing career
Kinský became a goalkeeping coach for the youth team of FC Tempo Prague after finishing his playing career, stating his desire to work as a goalkeeping coach in professional football in the future, but not as a head coach.

Personal life
Kinský studied Russian at school. He and his wife, Martina, have two children, Tonda and Andrea, who both take part in sports. His son played youth football for FC Tempo Prague in 2012.

Career statistics

Club
Source:

Notes

International
Source:

Honours

Club
Slovan Liberec
Gambrinus Liga: 2001–02
Czech Cup: 1999–2000

Country
Czech Republic
UEFA European Championship semi-finalist: 2004

References

External links

 
 
 
 

Living people
1975 births
Footballers from Prague
Association football goalkeepers
Czech footballers
Czech Republic under-21 international footballers
Czech Republic international footballers
Czech expatriate footballers
UEFA Euro 2004 players
2006 FIFA World Cup players
Czech First League players
Dukla Prague footballers
1. FK Příbram players
FC Slovan Liberec players
FC Saturn Ramenskoye players
Russian Premier League players
Expatriate footballers in Russia